Jessie is an American comedy television series created by Pamela Eells O'Connell that aired on Disney Channel from September 30, 2011 to October 16, 2015. The series stars Debby Ryan, Peyton List, Cameron Boyce, Karan Brar, Skai Jackson, and Kevin Chamberlin.

Series overview

Episodes

Season 1 (2011–12)

Season 2 (2012–13)

Season 3 (2013–14)

Season 4 (2015)

References 

Lists of American children's television series episodes
Lists of American comedy television series episodes
Lists of Disney Channel television series episodes